Pathaam Valavu is a 2022 Indian Malayalam language thriller film directed by M. Padmakumar starring Indrajith Sukumaran, Suraj Venjaramoodu and Aditi Ravi. The film's script was written by Abhilash Pillai, who also wrote Night Drive (2022) also starring Indrajith Sukumaran. Aditi Ravi plays a mother in the film. Ajmal Ameer returns to Malayalam cinema with this film after a hiatus.

Plot 
SI M.Sethunath is eager to go on leave for his wife Suja's delivery. He is 43 and Suja's first two carriages were misconceived, so he along with family is in great tension. On the day when his leave is supposed to start, his superior Shihab Ali asks him to find and capture Solomon who is out on a parole and hasn't returned after his return date. Sethu goes to Solomon's house and Solomon runs away. Later in the day Solomon tries to kill some local guys but they beats up Solomon. Sethu arrives on the stop and arrests Solomon.

One the way back to the police station, Solomon narrates his story. He was an orphan and a well loved man in his village. He falls in love with a Hindu girl Seetha and they both elopes and get married. They now have a baby girl Lachumol. One day during the local church festival, Lachumol goes missing. The next day, Lachumol's corpse is found and the postmortem report tells that she was raped before death. Police finds the culprits, two youngsters who are drug addicts as well and they did it under influence. The court acquits the accused due to lack of evidence as the police also helps them.

Seetha tells Solomon that she wants both the culprits to be killed. Solomon kills one of them in front of the court but gets captured by their friends and relatives. Solomon is sent to jail. Now he is out on parole, he tells Sethu that this is his only chance to get revenge. But Sethu tries to calm him down and takes him to police station. Meanwhile, Suja delivers a baby girl.

Once Sethu returns back from leave, he goes to the jail to see Solomon. Sethu tells Solomon that he does not have to think about revenge anymore because that guy is no more. Sethu hands over a news paper report of a car accident in which the youngster was killed. Solomon says that during his last 4 years in prison no God heard him and now if his prayers are answered, then that must be by someone who is also a father of a girl. Sethu silently walks away. In a flashback, it was shown that Sethu hitting the bike from behind and running over him.

In the final scenes of the movie, Solomon getting released from jail after his term is over and reuniting with Seetha who has been waiting for him.

Cast

Production and release
The film began production in the August of 2021. The film had its theatrical release on 13 May 2022 and OTT release through ManoramaMAX on 22 July 2022.

Soundtrack
Music by Ranjin Raj.

Reception
V. Vinod Nair of The Times of India rated 3/5 and opined that "Patham Valavu can be a one-time watch with an interesting twist". Fair Maithutty of The News Minute wrote that "Pathaam Valavu is underwhelming".

References

2022 films
2020s Malayalam-language films
Indian thriller drama films
2022 thriller drama films
Films directed by M. Padmakumar
Films scored by Ranjin Raj
Films shot in Kerala